The 1969 Copa Argentina was played between February 1969 and July 1969. The tournament was played as a knockout competition, with the participation of 32 teams; 19 of the Primera División, 1 of the Primera B, 12 of the Regional leagues.

Teams

Primera División

Argentinos Juniors
Atlanta
Banfield
Boca Juniors
Chacarita Juniors
Colón
Deportivo Morón
Gimnasia y Esgrima (LP)
Huracán
Independiente
Lanús
Los Andes
Newell's Old Boys
Platense
Quilmes
Racing
Rosario Central
San Lorenzo
Unión

Primera B 
Almagro

Regional leagues

All Boys (SR)
Altos Hornos Zapla
Américo Tesorieri
Atlético Tucumán
Central Norte
Godoy Cruz
Guaraní Antonio Franco
Lipton
Los Andes (SJ)
Sportivo Belgrano
Sporting Punta Alta
Sarmiento (SdE)

First round

|-

|-

|-

|-

|-

|-

|-

|-

|-

|-

|-

|-

|-

|-

|-

|-
|}

Round of 16

Final

Boca Juniors won 3–2 on aggregate.

External links
RSSSF: Copa Argentina 69

1969 domestic association football cups
Copa
Copa Argentina